Sawbridgeworth is a town and civil parish in Hertfordshire, England, close to the border with Essex. It is the northernmost part of the Greater London Built-up Area.

History 

Prior to the Norman conquest, most of the area was owned by the Anglo-Saxon Angmar the Staller.

The Manor of "Sabrixteworde" (one of the many spellings previously associated with the town) was recorded in the Domesday Book of 1086. After the Battle of Hastings it was granted to Geoffrey de Mandeville I by William the Conqueror. Local notables have included John Leventhorpe, an executor of both King Henry IV and King Henry V's wills, and Anne Boleyn, who was given the Pishiobury/Pishobury estate, located to the south of the town.

 

The mansion and surrounding land was acquired by Sir Walter Lawrence, the master builder, in the 1920s. In 1934, he instituted the Walter Lawrence Trophy for the fastest century in county cricket. He built a cricket ground and pavilion in the grounds where the great and the good of the cricket world came to play against Sir Walter's home team, which often included his three sons: Jim, Guy and Pat. Sir Walter also had two daughters: Molly and Gipsy. Great Hyde Hall was sold in 1945 and became a school. It is a Grade II* listed building and has now been divided into housing.

Much of the town centre is a conservation area; many of the buildings date from the Tudor, Stuart and Georgian periods.

Great St Mary's Church is a Grade I listed building; "of special interest as a substantially unaltered large medieval parish church, typical of the Hertfordshire type, and with an outstanding collection of memorials of the highest artistic quality". It was built in the 13th century (although a church on the site existed in Saxon times) and includes a Tudor tower containing a clock bell (1664) and eight ringing bells, the oldest of which dates from 1749. It is thought to be called 'Great' St Mary's to distinguish it from St Mary's, Gilston. Ralph Jocelyn of Hyde Hall, who was Lord Mayor of London in 1464 and in 1476, is buried here; images of many of his family and other locals have been engraved on brass, and the church is popular for enthusiasts of brass rubbing. The ghost of Sir John Jocelyn, known for his love of horses, is reputed to appear riding a white horse on the old carriage drive every 1 November.

The town's prosperity came from the  maltings, some of which now house antiques centres. Among the maltsters were George Fawbert and John Barnard; in 1839 they set up the Fawbert and Barnard charity to fund local children and their education, funding a local infant school that still exists today.

By the time of the Norman conquest, or soon after, Sawbridgeworth's rich farming land was fully developed for cultivation as was possible with the means available at the time: it was the richest village community in the county. Many important medieval families had estates here. The land was divided among them, into a number of manors or distinct estates; the lord of each manor had rights not only over this land but also over the people who farmed it. The number of manors increased during the Middle Ages, by a process of subinfeudation, that is the granting out of a part of an existing manor to a new owner so that the new manor was created. Many manors sprang from the original Domesday Book holding of the de Mandeville family. The first came to be called Sayesbury manor, from the de Say family who inherited it from the de Mandevilles in 1189. The many important people who held these manors built themselves houses with hunting parks around them; when they died their tombs enriched the parish church, so that today St Mary's has one of the finest collections of church monuments in the country.

During the Second World War RAF Sawbridgeworth, which is not in the civil parish, operated Supermarine Spitfires, Westland Lysanders, North American Mustangs and de Havilland Mosquito, among other types - for a complete history of the airfield, see the book Where the Lysanders were ....., by Paul Doyle, published in 1995 by Forward Airfield Research Publishing. The Walter Lawrence & Son Ltd joinery works, located between the canal and the railway, built over 1,000 Mosquito fuselage shells and wing skins for de Havilland during the Second World War. Subsequently, it reverted to making joinery and doors for the building trade. The joinery works was closed in about 1982 and houses were built on the site.

Sawbridgeworth was the birthplace of composer Bernard Rose (1916–1996) and the actor Stephen Greif (1944–2022).

Sawbridgeworth has been twinned with Bry-sur-Marne in France since 1973.

Governance

Parliamentary representation
Sawbridgeworth is in the parliamentary constituency of Hertford and Stortford. Since the formation of the constituency in 1983, it has elected Conservative Members of Parliament. The current MP is Julie Marson, elected in 2019.

Local government
Sawbridgeworth has three tiers of local government, at parish (town), district, and county level: Sawbridgeworth Town Council, East Hertfordshire District Council, and Hertfordshire County Council. The town council has twelve councillors. The hamlet of Spellbrook is included within the administrative boundaries of the town.

The parish of Sawbridgeworth was in the hundred of Braughing. From 1835 the parish was included in the Bishop's Stortford Poor Law Union. It therefore became part of the Bishop's Stortford Rural Sanitary District in 1872. Under the Local Government Act 1894 elected parish and district councils were created. Sawbridgeworth Parish Council came into office on 31 December 1894, and the parish was included in the Hadham Rural District. Sawbridgeworth was made an urban district on 1 April 1901, making it independent of the Hadham Rural District. It was decided that the whole parish of Sawbridgeworth was not suitable for becoming an urban district, and so the more rural western part of the parish was made a separate parish called High Wych on the same day, which remained in the Hadham Rural District.

Until 1914 Sawbridgeworth Urban District Council met at offices on Bell Street (sometimes called Cock Street). In 1914 the council moved to the upper floor of the town's fire station at 5 Church Street, which had been built in 1905. In 1937 the council built itself new offices on The Forebury, holding its first meeting in the new building on 5 July 1937.

Sawbridgeworth Urban District Council was granted a coat of arms on 20 July 1962.

The urban district was abolished under the Local Government Act 1972, becoming part of East Hertfordshire on 1 April 1974. A successor parish (and Sawbridgeworth Town Council) was created for the former urban district. The urban district council's former offices on The Forebury are now used as the town's library, whilst Sawbridgeworth Town Council is based at Sayesbury Manor on Bell Street.

Fire service
The town has an on-call fire station, in Station Road, with one fire engine. Sawbridgeworth had its own fire brigade from 1897 until it was merged into the National Fire Service in 1941. In 1948 control of the local fire brigade passed to the Hertfordshire Fire Brigade, since renamed the Hertfordshire Fire and Rescue Service, run by Hertfordshire County Council.

Geography
Sawbridgeworth adjoins the border between Hertfordshire and Essex. The village of Lower Sheering is across the county boundary into Essex, and adjoins Sawbridgeworth along its eastern edge, east of the railway station and of the River Stort. It has a Sawbridgeworth postal address, but is in the Epping Forest District of Essex.

Geology
Underlying the town at some depth is the London Clay stratum, with a thick layer of Boulder clay laid down during the ice ages, including the Anglian. The soil on top of this is a loam, with glacial erratics of Hertfordshire puddingstone conglomerate found around the town.

Education 
Sawbridgeworth has a secondary school, the Leventhorpe Academy, which also offers a public swimming pool and leisure centre. There is also one primary school, one junior school and one infant school in Sawbridgeworth.

Sport 
Sawbridgeworth Town, a non-league football club, plays at Crofters End.

Sawbridgeworth Cricket Club field five senior sides on a Saturday and seven colts sides, from ages nine to fifteen. The 1st XI plays in the Home Counties Premier Cricket League, and the other league sides play in the Hertfordshire Cricket League. The main ground is Town Fields, situated behind Bell Street. The second ground is at Leventhorpe Academy.

Sawbridgeworth has tennis and bowls clubs.

Local groups 
Sawbridgeworth is home to 309 Squadron of the Air Training Corps.

Transport 
The A1184 road runs through the town. The River Stort Navigation flows north–south along the eastern edge of the town, parallel to the railway, and past the Maltings.

The town is served by Sawbridgeworth railway station, located on the West Anglia Main Line between London Liverpool Street and Cambridge.

There are bus services to Harlow, Bishops Stortford, and Stansted Airport.

See also
Sawbridgeworth Marsh SSSI
The Hundred Parishes

Nearby villages
High Wych
Spellbrook
Much Hadham

Notable people
Alexander Annesley (c. 1753 - 1813), lawyer
David Beckham (1975-), former England captain, and singer Victoria Beckham (1974-) lived in Rowneybury House.
Anne Boleyn (c. 1501 - 1536), second wife of King Henry VIII, held Pishiobury until her execution.
Robert Jocelyn, 1st Viscount Jocelyn (c.1688-1756), Lord Chancellor of Ireland; he was a member of the Jocelyn family of Hyde Hall.
Pip Pyle (1950-2006), progressive rock drummer, particularly of Canterbury scene bands.
Thomas Rivers (1797-1878), nurseryman.
Frank Silcock (1838-1897), first-class cricketer and founding member of Essex County Cricket Club.
Christine Walkden, television presenter and gardener.

References

External links 
 Sawbridgeworth Town Council
 Great St Mary's church
 Leventhorpe Academy
 Sawbridgeworth Cricket Club
 www.geograph.co.uk: Photos of Sawbridgeworth and surrounding area
 Sawbridgeworth Fire Brigade History

 
Towns in Hertfordshire
Civil parishes in Hertfordshire
East Hertfordshire District